Palnissa is a monotypic moth genus of the family Erebidae. Its only species, Palnissa spatula, is known from the Palani Hills of south-central India. Both the genus and the species were first described by Michael Fibiger in 2008.

The wingspan is about 11 mm. The forewing is long, pointed and grey and brownish. The crosslines are broad and black at the costa. The terminal line is marked by black interveinal dots. The hindwing is light greyish with an indistinct discal spot. The fringes are whitish. The underside is beige, although the underside of the hindwing is whitish with an indistinct discal spot.

References

Micronoctuini
Moth genera
Monotypic moth genera